The 2009 KNVB Cup Final was a football match between Heerenveen and FC Twente on 17 May 2009 at De Kuip, Rotterdam. It was the final match of the 2008–09 KNVB Cup competition. Heerenveen beat FC Twente on penalties after the match finished 2–2 after extra time. It was the side's first KNVB Cup trophy.

Route to the final

Match

Details

References

2009
2008–09 in Dutch football
SC Heerenveen matches
FC Twente matches
May 2009 sports events in Europe
KNVB Cup Final 2009